Lophophelma obtecta is a moth of the family Geometridae first described by Hubert Robert Debauche in 1941. It is found on Sulawesi in Indonesia.

References

Moths described in 1941
Pseudoterpnini